Flipper pie is a traditional Eastern Canadian meat pie made from harp seal flippers. It is similar to a pot pie in that the seal flippers are cooked with vegetables in a thick sauce and then covered with pastry. It is specific to the province of Newfoundland and Labrador and primarily eaten in April and May, during the annual seal hunt. Although in the past, seal flippers were usually acquired directly from the boats that were used for the seal hunt (since they were considered a by-product of the seal fur trade), today they are usually purchased in grocery stores.  Seal meat has been described as tasting like rabbit or dark meat chicken, and fans of its flavour tend to be people who grew up eating it.

See also

Seal meat 
Cuisine of Canada

References

Cuisine of Newfoundland and Labrador
Savoury pies
Canadian cuisine
Cuisine of Atlantic Canada